The Wilcox Female Institute is a historic Greek Revival-style school building in Camden, Alabama. The two-story brick structure was built between 1845 and 1850 as a boarding school for girls.  The school closed in 1910 and the building was then used by the Wilcox County school system for over 50 years.  It was acquired by the Wilcox Historical Society in 1976.  The group made it into their official headquarters. It was placed on the National Register of Historic Places on April 3, 1975.

See also
Historical Marker Database

References

External links

National Register of Historic Places in Wilcox County, Alabama
School buildings on the National Register of Historic Places in Alabama
Defunct schools in Alabama
School buildings completed in 1850
Female seminaries in the United States
Greek Revival architecture in Alabama
History of women in Alabama
Historic American Buildings Survey in Alabama
1850 establishments in Alabama
Educational institutions established in 1850
Educational institutions disestablished in 1910